The North Adelaide Football Club is an Australian rules football club currently competing in the South Australian National Football League (SANFL). "North Adelaide Football Club" may also refer to:

 North Adelaide Football Club (1875–1884), a defunct Australian rules football club formerly playing in the South Australian Football Association
 North Adelaide Football Club (1881–1889), a defunct Australian rules football club formerly playing in the South Australian Football Association